The Orchestra of the Eighteenth Century is a Dutch early music orchestra.  Frans Brüggen and Lucy van Dael co-founded the orchestra in 1981. 
Sieuwert Verster became financial manager in 1984. Although he did not have a formal title with the orchestra, Brüggen served as the de facto principal conductor of the orchestra from its founding until his death in 2014.  Verster has served as the orchestra's manager since its founding.

As of August 2014, the orchestra consisted of 55 members, from many different countries, who all play on period instruments. The group was formed as a collective, so all orchestra members and the conductor receive equal shares of concert earnings.  The orchestra does not audition its members, but receives them through word-of-mouth invitations.

The orchestra has toured widely both in Europe and America and recorded extensively with Philips Classics, including symphonies of Beethoven, Haydn and Mozart.  In more recent years, the orchestra has recorded for the Glossa label.

References

External links
 Official Website of the Orchestra of the 18th Century
 Bach-cantatas.com: Orchestra of the 18th Century
 Glossa Music interview with Sieuwert Verster, 24 September 2008

Musical groups established in 1981
Early music orchestras
Dutch orchestras
Musical collectives
1981 establishments in the Netherlands